This is a list of medical schools located in the Philippines.

Metro Manila
City of Manila
Centro Escolar University - School of MedicineSan Miguel, Manila
Chinese General Hospital Colleges - College of MedicineSampaloc, Manila
Emilio Aguinaldo College - College of MedicineErmita, Manila
Manila Theological College - College of MedicineSampaloc, Manila
Metropolitan Medical Center - College of Arts, Sciences and Technology - College of MedicineSanta Cruz, Manila
Pamantasan ng Lungsod ng Maynila - College of MedicineIntramuros, Manila
San Beda University - College of Medicine San Miguel, Manila 
University of Santo Tomas - Faculty of Medicine and SurgerySampaloc, Manila
University of the Philippines - College of MedicineErmita, Manila
Caloocan
Manila Central University - Filemon D. Tanchoco Sr. Medical FoundationCaloocan, Metro Manila
Las Piñas
University of Perpetual Help System Dalta - JONELTA Foundation School of MedicineLas Piñas, Metro Manila
Makati
AMA College of MedicineMakati, Metro Manila
Muntinlupa
Pamantasan ng Lungsod ng Muntinlupa - College of Medicine
Pasig
Ateneo de Manila University - School of Medicine and Public HealthOrtigas Center, Pasig
Quezon City
Far Eastern University - Nicanor Reyes Medical FoundationWest Fairview, Quezon City
New Era University - College of MedicineNew Era, Quezon City
Our Lady of Fatima University-Quezon City Campus - College of MedicineGreater Lagro, Quezon City
St. Luke's College of Medicine - William H. Quasha Memorial FoundationQuezon City
University of the East - Ramon Magsaysay Memorial Medical CenterQuezon City
Valenzuela
Our Lady of Fatima University-Valenzuela Campus - College of MedicineValenzuela

North and Central Luzon
The Manila Times College of Subic- School of Medicine - Subic Bay 
Angeles University Foundation - College of MedicineAngeles City
Cagayan State University - College of MedicineTuguegarao, Cagayan
Isabela State University - College of Medicine and Allied Health ProfessionsEchague, Isabela (province)
La Consolacion University Philippines - College of MedicineMalolos
Lyceum-Northwestern University - Dr. Francisco Q. Duque Medical FoundationDagupan
Mariano Marcos State University - College of MedicineBatac, Ilocos Norte
Saint Louis University - School of Medicine Baguio 
St. Paul University Philippines - School of MedicineTuguegarao
University of Northern Philippines - College of Medicine Vigan, Ilocos Sur
Virgen Milagrosa University Foundation - College of MedicineSan Carlos, Pangasinan
Pines City Colleges - School of Medicine. Be a Warrior Be a PCCian Doctor Baguio 
PLTCI-College of MedicineSolano, Nueva Vizcaya

South Luzon
Adventist University of the Philippines - College of Medicine Silang, Cavite
Batangas State University - College of MedicineBatangas City, Batangas
Bicol Christian College of Medicine - Ago Medical and Educational CenterLegazpi, Albay
Bicol University - College of MedicineLegazpi, Albay
Cavite State University - College of MedicineIndang, Cavite
De La Salle Medical and Health Sciences Institute - College of MedicineDasmariñas, Cavite
Philippine Muslim-Christian College of MedicineAntipolo, Rizal
Southern Luzon State University - College of Medicine Lucban, Quezon 
University of Perpetual Help Rizal - Calamba CampusCalamba, Laguna
 University of Perpetual Help - Dr. Jose G. Tamayo Medical University Biñan, Laguna 
Lyceum of the Philippines University - St. Cabrini College of Health and Sciences - College of MedicineSanto Tomas, Batangas

Visayas
Cebu Doctors' University - College of MedicineMandaue
Cebu Institute of MedicineCebu City
Cebu Normal University - Vicente Sotto Memorial Medical Center College of MedicineCebu City
Central Philippine University - College of Medicine Jaro, Iloilo City
Iloilo Doctors' College of MedicineMolo, Iloilo City
Matias H. Aznar Memorial College of MedicineCebu City
 Remedios T. Romualdez Medical School Foundation - College of MedicineTacloban
Silliman University Medical SchoolDumaguete
Southwestern University - School of MedicineCebu City
University of Cebu - School of MedicineMandaue
University of Saint La Salle - College of MedicineBacolod
University of the Philippines School of Health Sciences Palo, Leyte
University of the Visayas - Gullas College of MedicineMandaue
West Visayas State University - College of MedicineLa Paz, Iloilo City

Mindanao
Ateneo de Zamboanga University - School of MedicineZamboanga City
Brokenshire College - School of MedicineDavao City
Davao Medical School FoundationDavao City
Jose Maria College - School of MedicineDavao City
Liceo de Cagayan University - College of MedicineCagayan de Oro
Mindanao State University - College of MedicineMarawi
Mindanao State University - College of MedicineGeneral Santos
University of Southern Mindanao - College of MedicineKabacan, South Cotabato
Western Mindanao State University - College of MedicineZamboanga City
Xavier University - Dr. José P. Rizal School of MedicineCagayan de Oro

See also
List of medical schools
Medical education in the Philippines
Medical school

References

Center for Educational Measurement (2017). Philippine Medical Schools as of June 2017 Makati, Philippines.
Professional Regulation Commission (2016). September 2016 Physician Licensure Examination: Performance of Schools in Alphabetical Order.

External links

Philippines
Medical schools in the Philippines
Medical colleges